Miss Philippines Earth 2006 was the 6th edition of the Miss Philippines Earth pageant. It was held on May 14, 2006 at the University of the Philippines Theater in Quezon City, Philippines.

The event was broadcast by ABS-CBN Network in the Philippines and The Filipino Channel internationally. Genebelle Raagas, Miss Philippines Earth 2005 crowned her successor Catherine Untalan as Miss Philippines Earth 2006 at the conclusion of the event. Untalan won against 23 other candidates and became the representative of Philippines in the international Miss Earth 2006 beauty pageant.

The pageant
The twenty-four candidates that competed for the Miss Philippines 2006 title were formally presented at the poolside of Hotel Intercontinental in Makati on April 21, 2007. The ladies introduced themselves and spoke about their environmental platforms to the media. The regions of the Philippines and some Filipino communities abroad were represented by candidates who won in separate searches.

Results
Color keys

Special awards
 Gandang Ricky Reyes Award - #19 April Love Jordan
 Miss Golden Sunset Resort - #3 Francis Dianne Cervantes
 Best in Evening Gown - #12 Jacqueline Boquiron
 Best in Swimsuit - #4 Faith Averie Mercado
 Best in Cultural Attire - #9 Chrismin Anne Lim
 Miss Talent - #5 Arianne Veneracion
 Miss Photogenic - #24 Ginger Conejero
 Miss Friendship - #13 Andrea Dimalanta

Candidates
The following is the list of the official contestants of Miss Philippines Earth 2005 representing various regions in the Philippines:

See also
:Miss Earth 2005

References

External links
Official Website
Lil' Earth Angels Official Website

2006
2006 beauty pageants
2006 in the Philippines
May 2006 events in the Philippines